The Louis and Artur Lucian Award in Cardiovascular Diseases is a prize for cardiovascular medicine conferred by McGill University. Described as Canada's "top cardiovascular research prize", it has been awarded annually since 1978, except in 2007.


Previous recipients 

 1978 Nicolae and Maya Simionescu, Bucharest and Yale University
 1980 , Johns Hopkins University
 1981 Gilbert Thompson, Hammersmith Hospital
 1982 , University of Copenhagen
 1983 , University of California
 1984  and Una Ryan, University of Miami
 1985 Earl Wood, Mayo Clinic
 1986 , University of Antwerp
 1987 , University of California
 1988 , University of South Alabama
 1990 , Vanderbilt University
 1991 , State University of New York, Syracuse
 1992 Judah Folkman, The Children's Hospital, Boston
 1993 Arthur Brown, Baylor College of Medicine
 1994 John B. Barlow, University of Witwatersrand, South Africa
 1996 Robert Furchgott, State University of New York and Salvador Moncada, University College, London
 1997 Russell Ross, University of Washington
 1998 , Johns Hopkins University
 1999 Victor J. Dzau, Harvard Medical School
 2000 Robert J. Lefkowitz, Duke University Medical School
 2001 Mark C. Fishman, Harvard Medical School
 2002 Salim Yusuf, McMaster University
 2003 Eric N. Olson, University of Texas Southwestern Medical Center
 2004 , University of Louisville
 2005 , Jr., Harvard Medical School
 2006 Peter Carmeliet, University of Leuven
 2007 not awarded
 2008 , Harvard Medical School
 2009 Peter Libby, Harvard Medical School
 2010 , Stanford University School of Medicine
 2011 , University of California, San Francisco
 2012 Garret A. FitzGerald, Perelman School of Medicine, University of Pennsylvania
 2013 David Ginsburg, University of Michigan
 2014 , University of Cincinnati College of Medicine
 2015 , University of Cincinnati College of Medicine
 2016 Brian K. Kobilka, Stanford University School of Medicine
 2017 John McMurray, University of Glasgow
 2018   Dan M. Roden, Vanderbilt School of Medicine ; Nabil G. Seidah, Montreal Clinical Research Institute
 2019   Joseph A. Hill, University of Texas Southwestern Medical Center

Source: McGill University

See also 
 List of medicine awards

References 

Medicine awards
Canadian awards
Cardiology
Awards established in 1978
1978 establishments in Canada